Qalal may refer to:

 Qalal, Azerbaijan, place name
 kallal, term used in rabbinical writings for the stone vessel used for the ashes of the red heifer